The Șatra is a right tributary of the river Rotunda in Romania. It flows into the Rotunda near Libotin.

References

Rivers of Romania
Rivers of Maramureș County